The William Robb House is a mid 19th-century house in Charleston, South Carolina situated at No.12 (formerly No.4) Bee Street.

References

National Register of Historic Places in Charleston, South Carolina
Houses on the National Register of Historic Places in South Carolina
Houses in Charleston, South Carolina